WFN Strategies is an independent supplier of telecommunications engineering services to clients in the government, commercial, oil and gas sectors. The company was established in 2001 by Wayne Nielsen, and has offices in Washington D.C.; Houston, Texas; London, England; and Perth, Australia.

WFN specializes in submarine and terrestrial optical cable, microwave, mobile and Wi-Fi, satellite and other RF technologies. Submarine Telecoms Forum, the first bi-monthly electronic magazine dedicated to the submarine cable industry, is published by WFN. In 2010, WFN Strategies became a Better Business Bureau-accredited business company.

Technologies 
Submarine communications cable
Terrestrial cable
Inter-platform systems
Microwave systems
Wireless broadband and WiMAX/ WiFi

Services 
Project planning
Systems engineering
Systems Acquisition
Implementation and supervision
Due diligence
Maintenance, repair, and operations

References

Telecommunications companies of the United States